The Royal Museum of Mariemont is a museum situated in Mariemont, near Morlanwelz, in Belgium. It is constituted around the personal collection of art and antiquities owned by the industrialist Raoul Warocqué (1870–1917) which were bequeathed to the Belgian state on his death.

Museum and collection
The museum displays a notable collection of Tournai porcelain and books, as well as antiquities from Ancient Greece, Ancient Egypt, Ancient Rome, Judaism and the Christian Near East, and the Far East. In 2012, the museum was expanded by a bequest of Pre-Columbian art from the collection of Yves and Yolande Boël. Artefacts from archaeological excavations in the Province of Hainaut are also displayed.

The original Château Warocqué, in which the museum was housed, was destroyed by fire in 1960. The current museum is housed in a building designed by the architect Roger Bastin, which was opened in 1975.

References

External links

Official website

Museums in Hainaut (province)
Art museums and galleries in Belgium
History museums in Belgium
Archaeological museums in Belgium
Organisations based in Belgium with royal patronage